Liu Shou-cheng (born 20 March 1951) is a Taiwanese politician. A member of the Democratic Progressive Party, he served as the magistrate of Yilan County from 1997 to 2005.

Education
Liu holds a bachelor's degree from National Chengchi University and master's and doctoral degrees from Fu Jen Catholic University, both in Taipei.

Personal
Liu is married to Tien Chiu-chin.

References

1951 births
Living people
Magistrates of Yilan County, Taiwan
Democratic Progressive Party (Taiwan) politicians
Fu Jen Catholic University alumni